Gambian Sign Language is a national sign language used in Gambia by the deaf community there. The only school for deaf children in the Gambia, St John's School for the Deaf, was set up by a Catholic priest from Ireland. Dutch Sign Language was introduced to the school along with British Sign Language which developed into Gambian Sign Language, incorporating some indigenous gestures used by the general population. Unlike much of West Africa, American Sign Language was not introduced to the Gambia until much later so the deaf community is not familiar with American Sign Language.

External links
Gambian Association of the Deaf & Hard of Hearing

French Sign Language family
Languages of the Gambia